Gananoque railway station in Gananoque, Ontario, Canada is served by Via Rail trains running from Toronto to Ottawa and Montreal. The station is an unstaffed but heated shelter.

Railway services
As of June 2020, Gananoque station is served by 1 domestic route (with connections). Departures have been reduced to 2 trains per day due to the coronavirus pandemic (effective June 3, 2020). 

 No local service is provided between Ottawa and Fallowfield, or Guildwood and Toronto on these trains.

History
Gananoque Junction was originally served by two railways: the Grand Trunk Montréal-Toronto mainline and the Thousand Islands Railway, an 8 km (five mile) short line railway that led to the waterfront. A mainline station also once existed in Lansdowne but was torn down soon after CN abandoned service to the village, in 1966.

The rail junction was relocated to the current station location in 1901 while timber shipments to Gananoque's docks were declining and tourism on the line was growing, with the Thousand Islands heavily promoted as a vacation destination by rail and steamship. Unlike most stations of its era, Gananoque Junction had no freight-handling facility and was solely a passenger station.

The last passengers transferred from CN to the Thousand Island Railway at Gananoque Junction in 1962. The short line's tracks are now gone.

While the junction station remains in service, a huge water tank that towered over Gananoque Junction in the steam train era is now gone. Locomotive #500 from the now-defunct short line operation is on display next to Gananoque town hall; the Arthur Child Heritage Museum occupies the site of the former Gananoque waterfront station.

References

External links

Via Rail stations in Ontario
Canadian National Railway stations in Ontario
Railway stations in Leeds and Grenville United Counties